Bäst Off was released in 2004 and is a compilation album by Markoolio.

Track listing
Sommar och sol - 3:11
Vi drar till fjällen - 2.46
Åka pendeltåg - 2:50
Mera mål - 3.47
Millennium 2 - 3:16
Gör det igen - 3:21
Sola och bada i Piña Colada - 3:39
Rocka på - 3:01 (with The Boppers)
Vi ska vinna! - 3:02 (with Excellence)
Jag orkar inte mer - 3.47
Vilse i skogen - 3.30
In med bollen (new) - 3:21
Biralåten - 3.53
Vem vill inte bli miljonär - 3:34
En kväll i juni - 2.58
Nostalgi - 3:40
Mister Krister Knas (NY) -2.56
Stackars lilla tomten - 3:12
Vandringsvisan (new) - 8.20
Replay Megamix - 3:41

Bonus videos
Vilse i skogen
In med bollen

DVD
Live concert
Videos:
Vi drar till fjällen
Åka pendeltåg
Sola och bada i Piña Colada
Millennium 2
Gör det igen
Mera mål
Rocka på!
Vi ska vinna
Jag orkar inte mer
Karaoke:
Mera mål
Jag orkar inte mer
Rocka på!
Bakom kulisserna:
Rocka på! (recording)
Jag orkar inte mer (video)
Filmen om Nisse

Charts

Weekly charts

Year-end charts

References

2004 compilation albums
Markoolio albums
Swedish-language compilation albums